The Rashba effect, also called Bychkov–Rashba effect, is a momentum-dependent splitting of spin bands in bulk crystals and low-dimensional condensed matter systems (such as heterostructures and surface states) similar to the splitting of particles and anti-particles in the Dirac Hamiltonian. The splitting is a combined effect of spin–orbit interaction and asymmetry of the crystal potential, in particular in the direction perpendicular to the two-dimensional plane (as applied to surfaces and heterostructures). This effect is named in honour of Emmanuel Rashba,  who discovered it with Valentin I. Sheka in 1959 for three-dimensional systems and afterward with 
Yurii A. Bychkov in 1984 for two-dimensional systems.

Remarkably, this effect can drive a wide variety of novel physical phenomena, especially operating electron spins by electric fields, even when it is a small correction to the band structure of the two-dimensional metallic state.  An example of a physical phenomenon that can be explained by Rashba model is the anisotropic magnetoresistance (AMR).

Additionally, superconductors with large Rashba splitting are suggested as possible realizations of the elusive Fulde–Ferrell–Larkin–Ovchinnikov (FFLO) state, Majorana fermions and topological p-wave superconductors.

Lately, a momentum dependent pseudospin-orbit coupling has been realized in cold atom systems.

Hamiltonian
The Rashba effect is most easily seen in the simple model Hamiltonian known as the Rashba Hamiltonian 
,
This is nothing but a two-dimensional version of the Dirac Hamiltonian (with a 90 degree rotation of the spins).

The Rashba model in solids can be derived in the framework of the k·p perturbation theory or from the point of view of a tight binding approximation. However, the specifics of these methods are considered tedious and many prefer an intuitive toy model that gives qualitatively the same physics (quantitatively it gives a poor estimation of the coupling ). Here we will introduce the intuitive toy model approach followed by a sketch of a more accurate derivation.

Naive derivation
The Rashba effect is a direct result of inversion symmetry breaking in the direction perpendicular to the two-dimensional plane. Therefore, let us add to the Hamiltonian a term that breaks this symmetry in the form of an electric field
.
Due to relativistic corrections, an electron moving with velocity v in the electric field will experience an effective magnetic field B
,
where  is the speed of light. This magnetic field couples to the electron spin in a spin-orbit term
,
where  is the electron magnetic moment.

Within this toy model, the Rashba Hamiltonian is given by
,
where . However, while this "toy model" is superficially attractive, the Ehrenfest theorem seems to suggest that since the electronic motion in the  direction is that of a bound state that confines it to the 2D surface, the space-averaged electric field (i.e., including that of the potential that binds it to the 2D surface) that the electron experiences must be zero given the connection between the time derivative of spatially averaged momentum, which vanishes as a bound state, and the spatial derivative of potential, which gives the electric field! When applied to the toy model, this argument seems to rule out the Rashba effect (and caused much controversy prior to its experimental confirmation), but turns out to be subtly-incorrect when applied to a more realistic model. While the above naive derivation provides correct analytical form of the Rashba Hamiltonian, it is inconsistent because the effect comes from mixing energy bands (interband matrix elements) rather from intraband term of the naive model. The next section says this effect is smaller**), the consistent approach includes a combination of splittings in the energy bands in a crystal that have an energy scale of eV, as described in the next section.

Estimation of the Rashba coupling in a realistic system – the tight binding approach
In this section we will sketch a method to estimate the coupling constant  from microscopics using a tight-binding model. Typically, the itinerant electrons that form the two-dimensional electron gas (2DEG) originate in atomic  and  orbitals. For the sake of simplicity consider holes in the  band. In this picture electrons fill all the  states except for a few holes near the  point.

The necessary ingredients to get Rashba splitting are atomic spin-orbit coupling
,
and an asymmetric potential in the direction perpendicular to the 2D surface
.

This hybridization can be understood within a tight-binding approximation.

,
where  is the total Hamiltonian. In the absence of a symmetry breaking field, i.e. , the hopping element vanishes due to symmetry. However, if  then the hopping element is finite. For example, the nearest neighbor hopping element is 
,

Note that overall the hole hopped one site and flipped spin.
The energy denominator in this perturbative picture is of course  such that all together we have
,
where  is the interionic distance. This result is typically several orders of magnitude larger than the naive result derived in the previous section.

Application
Spintronics - Electronic devices are based on the ability to manipulate the electrons position by means of electric fields. Similarly, devices can be based on the manipulation of the spin degree of freedom. The Rashba effect allows to manipulate the spin by the same means, that is, without the aid of a magnetic field. Such devices have many advantages over their electronic counterparts.

Topological quantum computation - Lately it has been suggested that the Rashba effect can be used to realize a p-wave superconductor. Such a superconductor has very special edge-states which are known as Majorana bound states. The non-locality immunizes them to local scattering and hence they are predicted to have long coherence times. Decoherence is one of the largest barriers on the way to realize a full scale quantum computer and these immune states are therefore considered good candidates for a quantum bit.

Comparison with Dresselhaus spin–orbit coupling 

The Rashba spin-orbit coupling is typical for systems with uniaxial symmetry, e.g., for hexagonal crystals of CdS and CdSe for which it was originally found and perovskites, and also for heterostructures where it develops as a result of a symmetry breaking field in the direction perpendicular to the 2D surface. All these systems lack inversion symmetry. A similar effect, known as the Dresselhaus spin orbit coupling arises in cubic crystals of AIIIBV type lacking inversion symmetry and in quantum wells manufactured from them.

See also

Electric dipole spin resonance

Footnotes

References

Further reading 
 
 
 A. Manchon, H. C. Koo, J. Nitta, S. M. Frolov, and R. A. Duine, New perspectives for Rashba spin–orbit coupling, Nature Materials 14, 871-882 (2015), http://www.nature.com/nmat/journal/v14/n9/pdf/nmat4360.pdf, stacks.iop.org/NJP/17/050202/mmedia
 http://blog.physicsworld.com/2015/06/02/breathing-new-life-into-the-rashba-effect/
 E. I. Rashba and V. I. Sheka, Electric-Dipole Spin-Resonances, in: Landau Level Spectroscopy, (North Holland, Amsterdam) 1991, p. 131; https://arxiv.org/abs/1812.01721

External links 
 

 

Semiconductors
Quantum magnetism
Spintronics